The 1989 Refuge Assurance Cup was the second competing of the Refuge Assurance Cup, for the most successful teams in the Sunday League. It was an English limited overs county cricket tournament which was held between 6 and 17 September 1989. The tournament was won by Essex County Cricket Club who defeated Nottinghamshire County Cricket Club by 5 runs in the final at Edgbaston, Birmingham.

Format
The cup was an end-of-season affair. The counties finishing in the top four of the 1989 Refuge Assurance League competed in the semi-finals. The top two teams were drawn at home. Winners from the semi-finals then went on to the final at Edgbaston which was held on 17 September 1989.

Semi-finals

Final

The attendance at the final was approximately 8,000.

References

CricketArchive tournament page 

Pro40
Refuge